Vaida Pikauskaitė (born 29 March 1991) is a Lithuanian racing cyclist. She was part of the team who won the pursuit at the world championships in 2012.

Major achievements 

2010
, European U23 Championships, U23 Women's Individual Pursuit
, European Championships, Women's Team Pursuit
2012
, European Championships, Women's Team Pursuit

References

External links
 

1991 births
Living people
Lithuanian female cyclists
Lithuanian track cyclists